Viola Langella (born 14 July 1961) is an Italian football manager and player who played as a defender for ACF Trani 80.

International career
Langella was also part of the Italian team at the 1984 European Championships.

References

1961 births
Women's association football defenders
A.C.F. Trani 80 players
A.S.D. Reggiana Calcio Femminile players
Serie A (women's football) managers
Serie A (women's football) players
Italian football managers
Italy women's international footballers
Italian women's footballers
Female association football managers
Living people